Paritta (Pali), generally translated as "protection" or "safeguard," refers to the Buddhist practice of reciting certain verses and scriptures in order to ward off misfortune or danger, as well as to the specific verses and discourses recited as paritta texts. The practice of reciting or listening to the paritta suttas began very early in the history of Buddhism.

Uses
In the Pali literature, these short verses are recommended by the Buddha as providing protection from certain afflictions.  The belief in the effective power to heal, or protect, of the sacca-kiriya, or asseveration of something quite true is an aspect of the work ascribed to the paritta.

It is also widely believed that all-night recitations of paritta by monks bring safety, peace and well-being to a community.  Such recitations will also occur on auspicious occasions, such as the inauguration of a new temple or home or to provide blessings upon those who hear. Conversely, paritta discourses are recited on inauspicious occasions as well, such as at a funeral or on the death anniversary of a loved one.  They may also be recited to placate antagonistic spirits. The Mahavamsa contains the earliest historical reference to this practice, describing how Upatissa I of Anuradhapura instructed monks to recite the Ratana Sutta through the night during a period when Sri Lanka was afflicted by plague and disease.

Discourse types
There are several paritta verses that are identified as such within the Pali Canon.

Reverential
Most paritta involve offering praise to the Buddha or, more broadly, the Triple Gem (Buddha, Dhamma, Sangha).  Of these paritta, one of the best known is the Ratana Sutta (Sn 2.1) where, for instance, it states in part:
Whatever treasure there be either here or in the world beyond, whatever precious jewel there be in the heavenly worlds, there is nought comparable to the Tathagata (the Perfect One). This precious jewel is the Buddha. By this (asseveration of the) truth may there be happiness.

Aid seeking
A few paritta involve the asking directly for the aid of the Buddha.  Examples of this type of paritta verse can be seen in the Candima Sutta (SN 2.9) and Suriya Sutta (SN 2.10) of the Samyutta Nikaya. In these two scriptures, the deities Canda and Surya protect themselves from the attack of the eclipse deity Rahu by reciting short verses praising the Buddha and pleading for his protection:
"O Buddha, the Hero, thou art wholly free from all evil. My adoration to thee. I have fallen into distress. Be thou my refuge."
In these cases, the Buddha is shown as specifically hearing and responding to the paritta; he enjoins Rahu to release the captive deities rather than have his "head split into seven pieces".

Blessing
Another type of paritta relies on the virtue of the individual who is ascribed as reciting the paritta in the Canon, rather than making reference to the virtues of the Buddha.  This type of paritta can be seen in the Angulimala Sutta, the story of the murderer-turned-monk Angulimala.  On passing a pregnant woman experiencing a difficult labor, Angulimala is moved to provide assistance.  Asking the Buddha how he can help, the Buddha tells him to provide a sort of blessing to the woman by reciting a short verse proclaiming his own virtue:
Sister, since I was born in the noble birth, I do not recall intentionally killing a living being. Through this truth may there be wellbeing for you, wellbeing for your fetus.
This verse is now used as a blessing for expectant mothers in the Theravada Buddhist tradition.

Forms of expression
The Buddha and the arahants (the Consummate Ones) can concentrate on the paritta suttas without the aid of another. However, when they are ill, it is easier for them to listen to what others recite, and thus focus their minds on the dhamma that the suttas contain, rather than think of the dhamma by themselves. There are occasions, as in the case of illness, which weaken the mind (in the case of worldlings), when hetero-suggestion has been found to be more effective than autosuggestion. In the Gilana Sutta, even the Buddha Himself had the Seven Factors of Enlightenment recited to him by another monk to recover from a grave illness.

While paritta texts generally are recited aloud, other mediums are known as well.  In Thailand, paritta texts are printed on small pieces of cloth containing images of the Buddha or famous monks.  Similar text- often in the Khom Thai script- is sometimes incorporated into tattoos believed to have protective powers, known as Sak Yant.

Collections
Paritta discourses are widely used and known, even if not necessarily understood, throughout the Theravada Buddhist world.  Popular collections of paritta verses are among the most widely known Pali texts in many Theravada countries. Translations of Paritta texts have not proven to be particularly popular- they are often little easier to understand than the Pali texts themselves, and in popular belief it is not necessary to understand the recitation for it to be effective. Different Theravada regions have developed distinct sets of paritta repertoires.

Myanmar (Burma) 
In Myanmar, the most popular paritta collection is called Mahāparitta, which comprises eleven texts, with 8 derived from the Milindapañha and commentarial lists. The second is the called the Sīrimaṅgala-paritta, which was compiled by Prime Minister U Nu's Sīrimaṅgala Paritta Association in 1950. This collection consists of thirty-one texts, including eleven from Mahāparitta, and another twenty, including the Buddha's first sermon (Dhammacakkappavattana Sutta), a synopsis of the twenty-four conditions in the Paṭṭhāna, the seventh book of the Abhidhamma Piṭaka, and the Mahāsatipaṭṭhāna Sutta, which provides the textual basis for vipassanā meditation. The Paṭṭhāna is the single most popular paritta in Myanmar.

Sri Lanka 
The preferred paritta repertoire in Singapore is known in Sinhala as the Pirit Potha ("The Book of Protection"), Maha Pirit Potha, or Catubhāṇavāraapali ("Text of the Four Recitals").  It has also been referred to as the "Buddhist Bible." Copies of this collection are common in the home of Sri Lankans, with children being instructed in the recitations in the morning and before bed. The most commonly recited texts are the Mangala Sutta, Ratana Sutta, Karaniya Metta Sutta, and Khuddakapatha. The most common versions of the Maha Pirit Potha may have originated from a precursor of the Khuddakapatha, which otherwise receives relatively little attention in Theravada countries.
 
The book typically contains a collection of twenty-four or twenty-nine discourses (suttas) almost all delivered by the Buddha, and found scattered in the five original collections (nikayas) in Pali, which form the Sutta Pitaka, the "Canonical Discourses."  Below, these discourses and related canonical sources are identified.

Thailand 
In Thailand, the most important collection of paritta texts is The Royal Chanting Book, which was compiled by Saṅgharāja Sā Phussadeva under the sponsorship of King Chulalongkorn and published in 1880. The Royal Chanting Book comprises various parittas and suttas, and condensed versions of the three sections of the Pali canon, the Vinaya Piṭaka, Sutta Piṭaka and Abhidhamma Piṭaka, under the titles Phra Vinaya, Phra Sūtra, and Phra Paramartha, respectively. The Jinapañjara is the single most popular paritta in Thailand.

See also
 Awgatha
 Buddhist chant
 Jinapañjara
 Sacca-kiriyā
 Smot (chanting)

Notes

References

Sources 
 Anandajoti Bhikkhu (edition, trans.) (2004). Safeguard Recitals. Kandy: Buddhist Publication Society. .
 Piyadassi Thera (trans. only) (1999a). The Book of Protection: Paritta. Kandy: Buddhist Publication Society.  Retrieved 08-14-2008 from "Access to Insight".
 Piyadassi Thera (trans.) (1999b). Candima Sutta: The Moon Deity's Prayer for Protection (SN 2.9).  Retrieved 08-14-2008 from "Access to Insight".
 Piyadassi Thera (trans.) (1999c). Gilana Sutta: Ill (Factors of Enlightenment) (SN 46.16). Retrieved 08-14-2008 from "Access to Insight".
 Piyadassi Thera (trans.) (1999d). Ratana Sutta: The Jewel Discourse (Sn 2.1).  Retrieved 08-15-2008 from "Access to Insight".
 Piyadassi Thera (trans.) (1999e). Suriya Sutta: The Sun Deity's Prayer for Protection (SN 2.10).  Retrieved 08-14-2008 from "Access to Insight".
 Rhys Davids, C.A.F., Dialogues of the Buddha, part 3.
 Rhys Davids, T.W. & William Stede (eds.) (1921-5). The Pali Text Society’s Pali–English Dictionary. Chipstead: Pali Text Society. A general on-line search engine for the PED is available at http://dsal.uchicago.edu/dictionaries/pali/. 
 Thanissaro Bhikkhu (trans.) (2003). Angulimala Sutta: About Angulimala (MN 86).  Retrieved 08-14-2008 from "Access to Insight".

External links 
Book of Protection by Piyadassi Thera
 Anandajoti Bhikkhu (edition and trans.) (2004). Safeguard Recitals (300+ pages)
 Anandajoti Bhikkhu (edition and trans.) (2006). Blessing Chants (22 pages)
 Anandajoti Bhikkhu (edition and trans.) (2006). Daily Chanting, a weekly sequence of paritta chants (80 pages)
 Paritta Chanting audio files Examples of Paritta in the Burmese style.
 Chandrabodhi chants the Ratana Sutta and other suttas in an 'Indian style' at   freebuddhistaudio

Buddhist practices
Pali words and phrases
Buddhist chants
Exorcism in Buddhism